Carlos Ortiz (September 9, 1936 – June 13, 2022) was a Puerto Rican  professional boxer. He held world titles in lightweight and light welterweight weight divisions. Along with Félix Trinidad, Miguel Cotto, Wilfredo Gómez, Héctor Camacho, José Torres, Edwin Rosario and Wilfred Benítez, Ortiz is considered among the best Puerto Rican boxers of all time by sports journalists and analysts. As of January 2018, Ortiz holds the record for the most wins in unified lightweight title bouts in boxing history at 10.

In 1991, Ortiz was inducted into the International Boxing Hall of Fame. In 2002, Ortiz was voted by The Ring magazine as the 60th greatest fighter of the last 80 years. He held 21st place in BoxRec ranking of the greatest pound for pound boxers of all time.

Boxing Career

Ortiz, born in Ponce, started his professional career in 1955 with a first round knockout of Harry Bell in New York City. He moved from Puerto Rico to New York before he began boxing as a professional, he would campaign there during the first stages of his career. After 9 bouts there, he fought outside New York for the first time, moving to Massachusetts to knock Al Duarte out in 4 rounds. His next 3 bouts were also outside New York, but he stayed within the confines of New England, as they happened, once again in Massachusetts, and in New Jersey.

He returned to New York again and won 4 more bouts in a row, then made his California debut, beating Mickey Northrup by a decision in 10 rounds. 2 more fights in California and one in New York went by, after which he returned to California to meet Lou Filippo, who was subsequently inducted into the International Boxing Hall Of Fame as a referee. The first time, it was declared a no-contest after 9 rounds, but in the second, Carlos prevailed, by a knockout in 9. 5 more wins followed, and then he met Johnny Busso, who handed Carlos his first loss, on a 10-round decision. That fight was held in New York, and in an immediate rematch between Ortiz and Busso, Carlos won, also by a 10-round decision, and also in New York.

Next Carlos flew to England to meet Dave Charnley, who was considered one of the top challengers of that time. Ortiz won the fight at Harringay Arena on a 10-round decision, after which promoters thought he was ready for a world title try.

Junior welterweight world champion
Carlos met Kenny Lane for the vacant world Jr. Welterweight title, in New York on the night of 12 June 1959. Lane had handed Carlos his second loss months before, winning a 10-round decision over Ortiz in Florida. This time, Carlos became the World's Jr Welterweight champion, with a TKO of Lane at the end of 2nd round. Ortiz became the first Puerto Rican world boxing champion since Sixto Escobar more than 30 years before, and only the second Puerto Rican world boxing champion ever. Unfortunately for him, not much importance was being given to that division at the time, since that division's title had been vacant for 13 years. But Carlos defended his title twice, knocking out the respected, until then undefeated Mexican puncher Battling Torres in Torres' home ground of Los Angeles, and beating Duilio Loi in 15 rounds by decision at San Francisco.

His next fight was a rematch with Loi, and it took Ortiz to Milan, Italy to defend his crown. This time, it was Loi's turn to become a world champion, winning by a 15-round decision.

After another win, Ortiz traveled to Milan once again, and met Loi in a rubber match. This time, he lost again, by 15-round decision.

Lightweight world champion
Instead of going up in weight, like most boxers throughout history have done after losing the title in their original division, Ortiz went down in weight, and challenged world champion Joe Brown (also a member of the International Boxing Hall Of Fame). Ortiz won a 15-round decision over Brown on 21 April 1962 in Las Vegas, to win his second world title, this time in his second championship division. Ortiz defended with a 5-round knockout of Teruo Kosaka in Tokyo before making his Puerto Rican debut, with a 13-round knockout win over Doug Valiant to retain his title on 7 April 1963 in San Juan.

A knockout win in 14 rounds over another Hall of Famer, Gabriel Elorde, Flash in the Philippines followed, and then a rematch with Lane, this time Ortiz retaining his world Lightweight title with a 15-round decision in San Juan. But in 1965 he went to Panama and fought yet another member of the International Boxing Hall Of Fame, Ismael Laguna who defeated him in 15 rounds to claim Ortiz's world Lightweight title. A rematch in San Juan followed, and Ortiz regained the world Lightweight title beating Laguna by a 15-round decision also.

1966 saw Ortiz draw with world Jr Welterweight champion Nicolino Locche in a ten-round non-title affair in Argentina, and retain his title vs Johnny Bizarro (KO in 12 in Pittsburgh), Cuban Sugar Ramos (another International Boxing Hall Of Fame Member, KO in 5 rounds in Mexico City), and Filipino Flash Elorde, also by KO in 14 at a New York rematch. The Ramos fight proved controversial, because the WBC's president proclaimed at first that the punch with which Ortiz had beaten Ramos had been illegal, but he later reconsidered and gave Ortiz the title, and the knockout victory, back, with the condition that a rematch be fought in the future.

And so 1967 came, and Ortiz and Ramos met once again, this time in San Juan. Ortiz retained the title by a knockout in 4 rounds, and this time the bout went without any controversies. Then, he and Laguna fought a third time, and Ortiz retained his title by a 15-round decision in New York.

Later career
29 June 1968 proved to be Ortiz's last day as a world champion, as he lost his world lightweight title to Dominican Carlos Cruz on a 15-round decision in the Dominican Republic. Ortiz kept on fighting, but he never got another chance at a world title. He retired after losing at Madison Square Garden by a knockout in 6 rounds to Ken Buchanan. It was the only time he was stopped in his career. His final record was of 61 wins, 7 losses and 1 draw, with one bout declared a no-contest and 30 knockout wins.

Ortiz is also a member of the International Boxing Hall Of Fame and he always enjoyed taking photos with his fans and signing autographs for them.

Death
Carlos Ortiz died on June 13, 2022 in New York at age 85.

Professional boxing record

Legacy
He is recognized at Ponce's Parque de los Ponceños Ilustres in the area of sports.

See also

 Lineal championship
 List of lightweight boxing champions
 List of light welterweight boxing champions
 List of WBA world champions
 List of WBC world champions
 List of undisputed boxing champions
 List of Puerto Rican boxing world champions
 List of Puerto Ricans
 Sports in Puerto Rico

References

External links

 
Carlos Ortiz - CBZ Profile
 https://boxrec.com/media/index.php/National_Boxing_Association%27s_Quarterly_Ratings:_1962
 https://www.wbaboxing.com/wba-history/world-boxing-association-history
 https://titlehistories.com/boxing/na/usa/ny/nysac-l.html

|-

|-

|-

|-

|-

|-

|-

|-

|-

|-

|-

|-

|-

|-

1936 births
2022 deaths
Sportspeople from Ponce, Puerto Rico
International Boxing Hall of Fame inductees
Light-welterweight boxers
Lightweight boxers
Pan American Games competitors for Puerto Rico
World boxing champions
Puerto Rican male boxers